The Hampton Township School District is a comprehensive community public school district that serves students in kindergarten through sixth grade from Hampton Township, in Sussex County, New Jersey, United States.

As of the 2014-15 school year, the district and its one school had an enrollment of 653 students and 36.0 classroom teachers (on an FTE basis), for a student–teacher ratio of 18.2:1.

The district is classified by the New Jersey Department of Education as being in District Factor Group "GH", the third-highest of eight groupings. District Factor Groups organize districts statewide to allow comparison by common socioeconomic characteristics of the local districts. From lowest socioeconomic status to highest, the categories are A, B, CD, DE, FG, GH, I and J.

Students in seventh through twelfth grade for public school attend Kittatinny Regional High School located in Hampton Township, which serves students who reside in Fredon Township, Hampton Township, Sandyston Township, Stillwater Township and Walpack Township. The high school is located on a  campus in Hampton Township, about seven minutes outside of the county seat of Newton. As of the 2014-15 school year, the high school had an enrollment of 1,079 students and 97.0 classroom teachers (on an FTE basis), for a student–teacher ratio of 11.1:1. Kittatinny Regional High School was recognized as a National Blue Ribbon School of Excellence in 1997-98.

Schools
Schools in the district (with 2014-15 enrollment data from the National Center for Education Statistics) are:
Elementary school
Marian Emmons McKeown School, with 317 students in grades K-6
Dr. Janet Goodwin, Principal
Joseph Coladarci, Assistant Principal

Administration
Core members of the district's administration are:
Craig Hutcheson, Superintendent
Courtney Young, School Business Administrator / Board Secretary

References

External links
Hampton Township School District - McKeown School

School Data for the Hampton Township School District, National Center for Education Statistics
Kittatinny Regional High School

Hampton Township, New Jersey
New Jersey District Factor Group GH
School districts in Sussex County, New Jersey
Public elementary schools in New Jersey